Vernal is a crater on Mars, located at 6°N, 355.5°E in the Oxia Palus quadrangle. Structures resembling springs on Earth were found in Vernal crater.

Springs 
A study of images taken with the High Resolution Imaging Science Experiment (HiRISE) on the Mars Reconnaissance Orbiter suggests that hot springs once existed in Vernal crater, in the Oxia Palus quadrangle. These springs may have provided a long-time location for life. Furthermore, mineral deposits associated with these springs may have preserved traces of Martian life. In Vernal Crater, on a dark part of the floor two light-toned, elliptical structures closely resemble hot springs on the Earth. They have inner and outer halos, with roughly circular depressions. Many hills are lined up close to the springs. These are thought to have formed by the movement of fluids along the boundaries of dipping beds. The discovery of opaline silica by the Mars Rovers on the surface also suggests the presence of hot springs. Scientists proposed this area as one to be visited by the Mars Science Laboratory.

See also
 Climate of Mars
 Geological history of Mars
 Geology of Mars
 List of craters on Mars
 Water on Mars

References 

Impact craters on Mars
Oxia Palus quadrangle